FGIN-1-27 is an anxiolytic drug which acts as a selective agonist at the peripheral benzodiazepine receptor, also known as the mitochondrial 18 kDa translocator protein or TSPO. It is thought to produce anxiolytic effects by stimulating steroidogenesis of neuroactive steroids such as allopregnanolone.

References 

Tryptamines
Anxiolytics
TSPO ligands
Fluoroarenes